Hawley may refer to:

 Hawley (surname)

Titles
 Baron Hawley
 Hawley baronets

Places named Hawley
In Australia
 Hawley Beach, Tasmania

In the United Kingdom
 Hawley, Hampshire
 Hawley, Kent

In the United States
 Hawley, Colorado
 Hawley, Idaho
 Hawley, Massachusetts
 Hawley, Minnesota
 Hawley, Missouri
 Hawley, Pennsylvania
 Hawley, Texas
 Hawleyville, Connecticut
 Ephraim Hawley House, Trumbull, Connecticut
 Gideon Hawley House, Barnstable, Massachusetts
 Octagon House (Barrington, Illinois), also known as Hawley House
 Thomas Hawley House, Monroe, Connecticut
 Hawley, fictional town in the film Jeremiah Johnson

See also
 Haughley
 Justice Hawley (disambiguation)
 Senator Hawley (disambiguation)